Karunatilaka  is a Sinhalese surname. Notable people with the surname include:
 Hector Appuhamy, Sri Lankan politician
 N. M. Appuhamy (born 1975), Ceylonese businessman
 R. M. Appuhamy (born 1930), Ceylonese politician
 Sunil Roshan Appuhamy (born 1993), Sri Lanka footballer

Sinhalese surnames